Treasure Planet (An Original Walt Disney Records Soundtrack) is the soundtrack album to the 2002 animated science fiction action-adventure film Treasure Planet. The album features seventeen tracks – fifteen tracks from the score composed by James Newton Howard, and also featured two pop singles: "I'm Still Here" and "Always Know Where You Are". Walt Disney Records released the film's soundtrack album on November 19, 2002. The film's score received positive critical reception, with praise directed on Howard's composition.

Background 
The film marked Howard's third collaboration with Walt Disney Animation Studios; he previously scored for Dinosaur (2000) and Atlantis: The Lost Empire (2001). The music from the film is largely orchestral in nature. Howard said that the score is "very much in the wonderful tradition of Korngold and Tiomkin and Steiner." The score has been described as a mixture of modern "classical style" music in the spirit of Star Wars and Celtic music. Scottish fiddler Alasdair Fraser is credited as the co-composer of the track "Silver Leaves", and is also listed as a soloist in the film's credits.

The music includes two moderately successful pop singles — "I'm Still Here" and "Always Know Where You Are". The Goo Goo Dolls frontman John Rzeznik performed both the tracks in the film version, whereas the latter was recorded by the British pop-rock group, BBMak, which was featured in the soundtrack.

Originally, Alan Silvestri was supposed to compose the film's score, but he dropped of it and went on to score another film for Walt Disney Animation Studios, Lilo & Stitch (2002). Jerry Goldsmith, who previously worked with the studio on Mulan (1998), was also considered to compose the score.

Track list

Reception 
Writing for BBC, Jack Smith stated "James Newton Howard's score is firmly in the old-fashioned escapade mould, more swash and buckle than Space Odyssey. It is, perhaps, less of a tribute to the music's descriptive powers than a result of the familiarity of Disney's musical conventions that the listener feels they would be able to guess the plot without ever having seen the film [...] This soundtrack is certainly workmanlike and inoffensive, but there's little buried treasure awaiting anyone digging beneath the surface." Jason Ankeny of Allmusic wrote "Treasure Planet is pure Disney formula, balancing rousing action, cornball comedy, and bittersweet romance in bold, broad strokes. What sets it apart from its predecessor is the presence of Gaelic whistles and fiddles, as well as a fiery electric guitar that adds a dash of rock & roll to Howard's otherwise conventional symphonic sensibilities. The problem with Treasure Planet is the problem that plagues all contemporary Disney scores, and that's the mind-numbing predictability of the music's emotional arc." Filmtracks.com wrote "[James Newton] Howard's score is about as predictable as it could be, but it is enjoyable even so, launching Erich [Wolfgang] Korngold's bold style from The Sea Hawk to a place where no sailing score had gone before." A. O. Scott of The New York Times called the score as "treacle-dipped sea-chanty-on-steroids".

Personnel 
Credits adapted from Allmusic
 Songs
 David Campbell – string arrangement (track 1)
 Chris Chaney – bass (track 1)
 Paul Bushnell – bass (track 2)
 Gary Novak – drums (track 1)
 Abe Laboriel Jr. – drums (track 2)
 Jamie Muhoberac – keyboards (track 1,2)
 Luis Conte – percussion (track 1)
 John Rzeznik – guitar (track 1,2)
 Greg Suran – guitar (track 2)
 Tim Pierce – guitar (track 2)
 Andrew Scheps – programmer
 Carmen Rizzo – programmer
 Jon Lind – associate producer
 Cheryl Jenets – production coordinator
 Ken Allardyce – recording
 Allen Sides – recording
 Tom Lord-Alge – mixing
 Ted Jensen – mastering
 Brett Allen – guitar technician
 Doug McKean – protools
 Eric Ferguson – protools
 Score
 James Newton Howard – composer, producer, orchestrator
 Alasdair Fraser – additional music (track 7), solo fiddles
 Jim Weidman – score producer
 Rob Cavallo – music producer
 James T. Hill – electronic score producer
 Shawn Murphy – recording, mixing
 Dave Collins – mastering
 Phil Ayling – solo whistles
 Eric Rigler – solo whistles, bagpipes
 Nick Ingman – choir conductor
 Pete Anthony – orchestra conductor
 Brad Dechter – orchestrator
 Jeff Atmajian – orchestrator
 Jon Kull – orchestrator
 Pete Anthony –  orchestrator
 Jenny O'Grady – concertmaster
 Kira Lewis – additional engineering
 David Marquette – assistant recordist, scoring crew
 Chris Barrett – scoring crew
 Jake Jackson – scoring crew
 Jay Selvester – scoring crew
 Koji Egawa – scoring crew
 Marc Gebauer – scoring crew
 Chris Montan – executive producer
 Richard Grant – Auricle Control Systems technician
 Luis M. Fernandez – art direction
 Federico F. Tio – creative art direction
 John Blas – artwork
 Eric Tan – album design
 Marcella Wong – album design

International versions

Release history

Charts

References 

2002 soundtrack albums
Disney animation soundtracks
Walt Disney Records soundtracks
Film scores
Treasure Planet